In sociolinguistics, hypercorrection is non-standard use of language that results from the over-application of a perceived rule of language-usage prescription. A speaker or writer who produces a hypercorrection generally believes through a misunderstanding of such rules that the form is more "correct", standard, or otherwise preferable, often combined with a desire to appear formal or educated.

Linguistic hypercorrection occurs when a real or imagined grammatical rule is applied in an inappropriate context, so that an attempt to be "correct" leads to an incorrect result. It does not occur when a speaker follows "a natural speech instinct", according to Otto Jespersen and Robert J. Menner.

Hypercorrection can be found among speakers of less prestigious language varieties who attempt to produce forms associated with high-prestige varieties, even in situations where speakers of those varieties would not. Some commentators call such production hyperurbanism.

Hypercorrection can occur in many languages and wherever multiple languages or language varieties are in contact.

Types of over-applied rules
Studies in sociolinguistics and applied linguistics have noted the over-application of rules of phonology, syntax, or morphology, resulting either from different rules in varieties of the same language or second-language learning. An example of a common hypercorrection based on application of the rules of a second (i.e., new, foreign) language is the use of octopi for the plural of octopus in English; this is based on the faulty assumption that octopus is a second declension word of Latin origin when in fact it is third declension and comes from Greek.

Sociolinguists often note hypercorrection in terms of pronunciation (phonology). For example, William Labov noted that all of the English speakers he studied in New York City in the 1960s tended to pronounce words such as hard as rhotic (pronouncing the "R" as  rather than ) more often when speaking carefully. Furthermore, middle class speakers had more rhotic pronunciation than working class speakers did.

However, lower-middle class speakers had more rhotic pronunciation than upper-middle class speakers. Labov suggested that these lower-middle class speakers were attempting to emulate the pronunciation of upper-middle class speakers, but were actually over-producing the very noticeable R-sound.

Hypercorrection can also occur when learners of a new-to-them (aka second, foreign) language try to avoid applying grammatical rules from their native language to the new language (a situation known as language transfer). The effect can occur, for example, when a student of a new language has learned that certain sounds of his or her original language must usually be replaced by another in the studied language, but has not learned when not to replace them.

English
English has no authoritative body or language academy codifying norms for standard usage, unlike some other languages. Nonetheless, within groups of users of English, certain usages are considered unduly elaborate adherences to formal rules. Such speech or writing is sometimes called hyperurbanism, defined by Kingsley Amis as an "indulged desire to be posher than posh".

Personal pronouns
In 2004, Jack Lynch, assistant professor of English at Rutgers University, said on Voice of America that the correction of the subject-positioned "you and me" to "you and I" leads people to "internalize the rule that 'you and I' is somehow more proper, and they end up using it in places where they should not – such as 'he gave it to you and I' when it should be 'he gave it to you and me.'"

However, the linguists Rodney Huddleston and Geoffrey K. Pullum write that utterances such as "They invited Sandy and I" are "heard constantly in the conversation of people whose status as speakers of Standard English is clear" and that "[t]hose who condemn it simply assume that the case of a pronoun in a coordination must be the same as when it stands alone. Actual usage is in conflict with this assumption."

H-adding
Some British accents, such as Cockney, drop the initial h from words; e.g. have becomes ave. A hypercorrection associated with this is H-adding, adding an initial h to a word which would not normally have one. An example of this can be found in the speech of the character Parker in the marionette TV series Thunderbirds, e.g. "We'll 'ave the haristocrats 'ere soon" (from the episode "Vault of Death").  Parker's speech was based on a real person the creators encountered at a restaurant in Cookham.

Hyperforeignism

Hyperforeignism arises from speakers misidentifying the distribution of a pattern found in loanwords and extending it to other environments. The result of this process does not reflect the rules of either language. For example, habanero is sometimes pronounced as though it were spelled "habañero", in imitation of other Spanish words like jalapeño and piñata. Machismo is sometimes pronounced "makizmo", apparently as if it were Italian, rather than the phonetic English pronunciation which resembles the original Spanish word, .

English as a second language
Some English-Spanish cognates primarily differ by beginning with s instead of es, such as the English word spectacular and the Spanish word . A native Spanish speaker may conscientiously hypercorrect for the word establish by writing or saying , which is archaic, or an informal pronunciation in some dialects.

Serbo-Croatian
As the locative case is rarely found in vernacular usage in the southern and eastern dialects of Serbia, and the accusative is used instead, speakers tend to overcorrect when trying to deploy the standard variety of the language in more formal occasions, thus using the locative even when the accusative should be used (typically, when indicating direction rather than location): "" instead of "".

Hebrew and Yiddish
Ghil'ad Zuckermann argues that the following hypercorrect pronunciations in Israeli Hebrew are "snobbatives" (from snob + -ative, modelled upon comparatives and superlatives):

The last two hypercorrection examples derive from a confusion related to the Qamatz Gadol Hebrew vowel, which in the accepted Sephardi Hebrew pronunciation is rendered as  but which is pronounced  in Ashkenazi Hebrew, and in Hebrew words that also occur in Yiddish. This leads to hypercorrections in both directions.

This may, however, be an example of oversimplification rather than of hypercorrection.
Other hypercorrections occur when speakers of Israeli Hebrew (which is based on Sephardic) attempt to pronounce Ashkenazi Hebrew, for example for religious purposes. The month of Shevat is mistakenly pronounced , as if it were spelled *.

Spanish
In some Spanish dialects, the final intervocalic  is dropped, such as in pescado (fish), which would typically be pronounced  but can be manifested as  dialectically.

Speakers of varieties that have  in all cases will frequently produce  even in places where peninsular Spanish has  when trying to imitate a peninsular accent. As Spanish orthography distinguishes the two phonemes in all varieties, but the pronunciation is not differentiated in Latin American varieties, some speakers also get mixed up with the spelling.

Many Spanish dialects tend to aspirate syllable-final , and some even elide it often. Since this phenomenon is somewhat stigmatized, some speakers in the Caribbean and especially the Dominican Republic may attempt to correct for it by pronouncing an  where it doesn't belong.

German
The East Franconian dialects are notable for lenition of stops /p/ /t/ /k/ to [b], [d], [g]. As such a common hypercorrection is the fortition of properly lenis stops, sometimes including aspiration as evidenced by the speech of Günther Beckstein.

Proper names and German loanwords into other languages that have been reborrowed, particularly when they have gone through or are perceived to have gone through the English language are often pronounced "hyperforeign". Examples include "Hamburger" or the names of German-Americans and the companies named after them, even if they were or are first generation immigrants.

Some German speakers pronounce the metal umlaut as if it were a "normal" German umlaut.

Swedish
In Swedish, the word  is sometimes pronounced  when used as an infinitive marker (its conjunction homograph is never pronounced that way, however). The conjunction  is also sometimes pronounced the same way. Both pronunciations can informally be spelt . (".") When spelt more formally, the infinitive marker  is sometimes misspelt . (".*")

Informally it can be spelled  ("."), yet  is only acceptable in spoken language. When spelt more formally, they are often confused with each other. ("." as a correct form, compared to ""* as an incorrect form in this case). As an object form, using  in a sentence would be correct in the sentence "" ('I give them a gift.')

See also
Hypocorrection
English usage controversies
Eye dialect
List of English words with disputed usage
Mondegreen
Regularization (linguistics)
Shibboleth
Szadzenie

References

Citations

Sources cited
 Labov, William.  1966.  "Hypercorrection by the Lower Middle Class as a Factor in Linguistic Change".  In Sociolinguistics: Proceedings of the UCLA Sociolinguistics Conference, 1964.  William Bright, ed.  Pp. 84–113.  The Hague: Mouton.
 Joshua Blau, On Pseudo-Corrections in Some Semitic Languages. Jerusalem: Israel Academy of Sciences and Humanities 1970.

Sociolinguistics
Speech error
Linguistic error